Vladimir Nikolaevich Konstantinov (born March 19, 1967) is a Russian-American former professional ice hockey player who played his entire National Hockey League (NHL) career with the Detroit Red Wings. Previously, he had played for Soviet club CSKA Moscow. His career was ended in a limousine crash just six days after the Red Wings 1997 Stanley Cup victory.

Playing career

Defection from the Soviet Union
Konstantinov was drafted 221st overall in the 1989 NHL Entry Draft by the Detroit Red Wings, after impressing a Wings scout at the 1987 World Junior Championships, where a brawl broke out in the Soviet Union–Canada game.

Although the end of the Cold War was approaching, the Soviet Union was still not allowing their young ice hockey players to leave the country to play in the NHL. The Red Wings worked for over two years to get Konstantinov to Detroit. Konstantinov had previously signed a 25-year contract committing himself to the army, and if he deserted, he would be considered a felon in Russia, which would make him ineligible for a work visa in the United States. He also had a wife and daughter, and would not consider leaving without them.

A Russian journalist named Valery Matveev worked with Wings executive vice-president Jim Lites to secure an army discharge for Konstantinov. With cash provided by the Red Wings, Matveev bribed six Russian doctors to diagnose and confirm that Konstantinov was suffering from inoperable cancer, and thus secured his medical discharge from the military in the summer of 1991. The Red Wings were planning to fly Konstantinov and his family out from Russia and get him to Detroit in time for the start of training camp in September, but the 1991 Soviet coup d'état attempt forced a change in plans. With the airports closed, Matveev took the family by train to Budapest. Lites met them there, in Red Wings' owner Mike Ilitch's private jet, and went back to Detroit with Konstantinov aboard. His wife and daughter followed two days later on a commercial flight.

Detroit Red Wings
Konstantinov played more aggressively than most of his Russian contemporaries, specializing in getting opponents off their game. "For my game," he explained, "I don’t need to score the goal. I need someone to start thinking about me and forgetting about scoring goals." While he was known as "Vladdie" to his teammates, his aggressive style of play earned him the nicknames "Vladinator" and "Vlad the Impaler" among the media and fans, as well as “the Red Shark”.

Konstantinov was part of the unit known as "The Russian Five", which consisted of him and fellow defenseman Slava Fetisov, and forwards Igor Larionov, Sergei Fedorov and Slava Kozlov.

Konstantinov earned the NHL Plus/Minus Award in 1995–96, with a plus/minus difference of +60. The +60 was the highest rating a player achieved since Wayne Gretzky finished with a +70 in the 1986–87 season; it wouldn't be matched or surpassed until Johnny Gaudreau registered a +64 in the 2021-22 season.

In 1996–97, Konstantinov helped his team to win the Stanley Cup against the Philadelphia Flyers. Flyers head coach Terry Murray expected his top line of centre Eric Lindros, left winger John LeClair and right winger Mikael Renberg—known as the "Legion of Doom" for its scoring and toughness—to face Konstantinov. However, Red Wings head coach Scotty Bowman surprised the Flyers by instead opting for the finesse-oriented defense pairing of Nicklas Lidström and Larry Murphy to neutralize the Lindros line's forechecking. In that same year, Konstantinov was runner-up to Brian Leetch for the James Norris Memorial Trophy, given to the NHL's best defenseman. This would turn out to be Konstantinov's final season.

Limousine crash
Following a golf outing with the Stanley Cup on June 13, 1997, celebrating the Red Wings' Stanley Cup triumph, Konstantinov, along with Russian hockey legend Viacheslav Fetisov and team masseur Sergei Mnatsakanov, hired a limousine to drive them home. The driver, Richard Gnida, whose license was suspended at the time for drunk driving, lost control of the limousine and hit a tree on the median of Woodward Avenue, in Birmingham, Michigan. Konstantinov spent several weeks in a coma. As a result of the limousine crash, Konstantinov suffered from serious head injuries and paralysis while Fetisov escaped with relatively minor injuries and was able to play the following season. Mnatsakanov sustained significant head injuries as well, and spent some time in a coma; he has had a considerably more difficult recovery.

After the Red Wings successfully defended the Stanley Cup in 1998, Konstantinov was brought onto the ice in a wheelchair, surrounded by his teammates, to celebrate the win. Throughout the playoffs the Red Wings' catchphrase was the single word, "Believe", and throughout the 1997–98 season the Red Wings wore a patch, with the initials of Konstantinov and Mnatsakanov featured prominently, with the word "Believe" written in both English and Russian.

Although Konstantinov was never able to play hockey again due to the limousine crash, the Detroit Red Wings still recognized him as part of their team. The Red Wings sought and received special dispensation from the NHL Commissioner Gary Bettman to have his name engraved on the Stanley Cup after they won the 1998 title.

Retirement
Konstantinov's jersey #16 has not been officially retired by the Red Wings. However, out of respect for Konstantinov, no player has been given the number since. In 1999, newly acquired Pat Verbeek, who had worn #16 for much of his career, switched to #15. A similar situation occurred in 2001 when the Red Wings signed Brett Hull, who had worn #16 for the bulk of his career with the St. Louis Blues and Dallas Stars; Hull switched to #17. Drafted prospect Xavier Ouellet, who had worn #16 as a member of the Grand Rapids Griffins, switched to #61 for the Red Wings.

The Red Wings kept his locker set up for him through the 97-98 season, although he would never be capable of playing hockey again. A rock engraved with "Believe" sat in his place.

Konstantinov's condition has improved considerably since his accident. While he still has trouble speaking and walking, he has been seen several times a season watching Red Wings games from a private box in Detroit. In a profile with the NHL, Vladimir's wife Irina noted that injuries to his brain were in part to the left frontal lobe; she said that Vladimir "can’t process idealistic feelings about life, like love of country or happiness that his child is graduating. Everything for him is matter of fact."

Konstantinov returned to the ice at Joe Louis Arena, helped by a walker, for the pre-game number retirement ceremony for Steve Yzerman on January 2, 2007.

At the 2014 NHL Winter Classic, Konstantinov was helped onto the ice for a rare Russian Five reunion with his former teammates Sergei Fedorov, Viacheslav Fetisov, Vyacheslav Kozlov and Igor Larionov.

On March 6, 2014, he was in attendance at the retirement of former teammate Nicklas Lidström's number.

On December 27, 2016, he was in attendance along with 29 other members of the 1997 Stanley Cup winning Red Wings team and former coach Scotty Bowman to celebrate the 20th anniversary of the 1997 Stanley Cup championship team.

Konstantinov was present for the final game at Joe Louis Arena, participating with multiple other Red Wings legends in the post-game ceremony.

International play
Konstantinov has participated in six international tournaments for the Soviet Union:
1986 World Junior Ice Hockey Championships
1986 World Ice Hockey Championships
1987 World Junior Ice Hockey Championships
1989 World Ice Hockey Championships
1990 Men's World Ice Hockey Championships
1991 Men's World Ice Hockey Championships

During the final game of the 1987 World Junior Ice Hockey Championships between Canada and the Soviet Union, a bench-clearing brawl known as the Punch-up in Piestany took place. The fight is famous for officials having turned off the arena lights in a desperate attempt at ending the 20 minute melee. During the fight Konstantinov leveled a head-butt that broke Greg Hawgood's nose. As a result of the brawl, both teams were disqualified from the tournament.

Personal life
Konstantinov lives in West Bloomfield, Michigan. His wife, Irina, now lives in Florida with their daughter, Anastasia Konstantinova.

Awards and achievements
NHL All-Rookie Team – 1992
NHL Second All-Star Team – 1996
NHL Plus/Minus Award – 1996 (+60)
 Two-time NHL Stanley Cup champion: 1997, 1998 Detroit Red Wings

Career statistics

Regular season and playoffs

International

References

External links

Wings of Legend page

1967 births
1997 road incidents
Living people
Detroit Red Wings draft picks
Detroit Red Wings players
HC CSKA Moscow players
People from Murmansk
People with traumatic brain injuries
People with severe brain damage
Road incidents in the United States
Russian ice hockey defencemen
Soviet ice hockey defencemen
Stanley Cup champions
Wedemark Scorpions players
Soviet defectors to the United States
Sportspeople from Murmansk Oblast